Haqeeqat is an Indian television docudrama series that aired on Sahara One based on the human rights violation either by the Indian Police Service or common man against the common man.

Concept
Each story is presented by director-producer Mahesh Bhatt, and showcases true stories of atrocities on common man ranging from child abuse and labor, custodial torture, death, rape, dowry deaths, immoral traffic, domestic violence and inhuman atrocities.

Awards

Radio and TV Advertisers Practitioners Association (RAPA) Awards
27th RAPA Awards 2001: 'Best Direction'
28th RAPA Awards 2002
Saurabh Narang: 'Best Director'
Haqeeqat: 'Best Nonfiction Programme'

Indian Telly Awards
Indian Telly Awards 2002: Saurabh Narang, 'Best Director' & 'Best Screenplay Writer'

Indian Television Academy Awards 

Hero Honda ITA Awards 2004: Geeta Nair, 'Best Actress'

Asian Television Awards
2002 Asian Television Awards: Haqeeqat: Long Format Docudrama

See also
 7 RCR (TV Series)
 Samvidhaan (TV Series)
 Satyamev Jayate (TV series)
 Pradhanmantri (TV Series)
 Television shows based on Indian history

References

External links
Haqeeqat News Article

Sahara One original programming
Indian documentary television series
Human rights in India
2001 Indian television series debuts